is a song by Japanese singer-songwriter Hikaru Utada. It was released by EMI Music Japan digitally on November 17, 2012, with a DVD single released December 26, 2012. The song is the theme to the third film of the Rebuild of Evangelion movie series, Evangelion: 3.0 You Can (Not) Redo, and was later included on their sixth Japanese-language studio album Fantôme, released in 2016. The single also marked Utada's last release under the then EMI-controlled EMI Music Japan as the label was absorbed into Universal Music Japan as EMI Records Japan in April 2013.

Background
Utada wrote "Sakura Nagashi" at the express interest of the staff for the Evangelion movie series. Although on hiatus at the time, Utada wrote and composed the song due to their appreciation of the movie series; they had also composed the themes for the previous two Evangelion films. Utada had not watched any of the first three Rebuild films or read their script prior to writing any of their theme songs, and wrote the song based on vague descriptions. Because director Hideaki Anno told her to simply write how she felt and Utada felt she could still not understand anything that happened in the film, Utada drew instead on her feelings on the recent death of her mother, and the 2011 Tōhoku earthquake and tsunami, which had happened days before she was requested to write the song.

A website was set up for the song, which also includes the music video, which was uploaded to Utada's YouTube channel on November 16, 2012. The video remained on the channel for 3 days before being deleted. It was instead replaced by a shortened version of the video. The website states that using the Hashtag "#SakuraNagashi" enters the Twitter user into a prize draw to win one of 1000 CD jacket-sized stickers.

"Sakura Nagashi" is described as "sentimental and beautiful; it is a requiem for life full of literary elegance". The website also has the lyrics to the song, in both Japanese and an English translation by Utada themselves.

Composition
"Sakura Nagashi" is a J-pop/piano rock song, composed of piano and strings, and in the latter part of the song drums, guitar and synths.  It was written by Utada, and British songwriter Paul Carter.

The song does not follow standard song structure, instead opting for a build-up of intensity throughout, before drums and guitars end the piece, somewhat similar to other works by Utada (such as "Kremlin Dusk" from Exodus).

The latter part of song repeats the opening line (. There are two instances of English lyrics used, "Everybody finds love in the end".

Music video
A music video was created by film-maker Naomi Kawase, who has previously won the Cannes International Film Festival Grand Prix as well as the Caméra d'Or. They stated about the video: "Because we live in a time such as this, I wanted to incorporate the message of the need to value the things that are presently and immediately around us and can be touched." Utada and Kawase met numerous times to share ideas during the making of the video.

The video depicts various images of scenery around Japan, such as fields of flowers, meadows, more industrialized areas and a baby being breastfed by its mother, as well as an umbilical cord being removed after the birth of a child. The video focuses on motherhood in "a universal light". The video itself is one of the few that does not feature Utada, the others being the previous Evangelion movie theme songs also written and composed by them ("Beautiful World" and "Beautiful World -PLANiTB Acoustica Mix- ", respectively).

The video was uploaded to Utada's YouTube channel on November 16, 2012, and remained there for 3 days before being replaced by a shortened version; the full length video was later made available for wide sale digital distribution on November 28 in Japan and on DVD single on December 26, 2012.

A few days after the release of "Sakura Nagashi", Paul Carter uploaded a version of the track to his YouTube channel, which featured him playing the song on piano.

On September 18, 2016, shortly before the release of Utada's first studio album in seven years, a new music video was released, containing excerpts from Evangelion: 3.0. Like the first video, it was then replaced by a shortened version, although just one day later.

Live performances
Aside from being the theme song to the movie Evangelion: 3.0 You Can (Not) Redo, no promotional activities for the single was done due to Utada being inactive from the music industry at the time of its release. Utada subsequently performed the song in full on Music Station in September 2016.

Personnel
Credits adapted from One Last Kiss EP liner notes 
Utada Hikaru - music, words, vocals, programming, string arrangement
Paul Carter - music, piano, programming, string arrangement
Atsushi Matsui - recording
Goetz B. - mixing
Kei Kawano - band leader, conductor, string arrangement
Takumi Ogasawara - drums
Tsuyoshi Kon - electric guitar
Takeshi Taneda - electric bass
Mamiko Amemiya - strings leader

Track listing

Charts

Weekly charts

Year-end chart

Certifications and sales

Release history

References

2012 singles
Hikaru Utada songs
Songs written by Hikaru Utada
2012 songs
Japanese film songs
Songs written for animated films
Neon Genesis Evangelion songs
EMI Music Japan singles